Mount Gilbert is a volcano which forms the northern part of Akun Island in the eastern Aleutian Islands, USA. Active fumaroles were documented 1 mi (1.5 km) northeast of the summit in the early 1900s.

See also
List of volcanoes in the United States of America

Sources
 Volcanoes of the Alaska Peninsula and Aleutian Islands-Selected Photographs
 Alaska Volcano Observatory

External links
 

Volcanoes of Aleutians East Borough, Alaska
Mountains of Alaska
Volcanoes of Alaska
Aleutian Range
Mountains of Aleutians East Borough, Alaska
Pleistocene stratovolcanoes
Stratovolcanoes of the United States